Gambling City is a  1975 Italian poliziotteschi film by Sergio Martino. It stars Luc Merenda, Enrico Maria Salerno, Dayle Haddon and Corrado Pani.

Gambling City is one of several European heist films produced in response to the popular success of American films in the genre like The Sting (1973). The film features many of the genre's standard conventions, including a Byronic hero who acts as a social bandit by practicing confidence tricks, the hero's forbidden love with a socially repressed damsel in distress (who may or may not exhibit facets of the femme fatale) and a morally corrupt dandy as villain and the hero's foil. The film was co-written by Martino and Ernesto Gastaldi, and produced by Luciano Martino.

Plot

Gambling City's story centers on the exploits of master poker player and card sharp Luca Altieri (Merenda); Altieri begins working for underground illegal gambling kingpin "The President" after running a scam at a high-stakes poker table in The President's casino; soon after entering The President's employ, however, Altieri enters into a violent competition with The President's hot-tempered, self-entitled son and heir, Corrado (Pani), for the hand of Corrado's girlfriend, Maria Luisa (Haddon).

Opening Scenes

Gambling City opens with Altieri entering an illegal gambling parlor in Milan and taking a seat beside several tuxedoed patrons at its high-roller table. In contrast to his slickly attired opponents Altieri is dressed in a threadbare cardigan and slacks and has  a carnation in his lapel. Noticing the newcomer's obvious lack of means at a table where a single chip is worth 10,000 lira, one player asks Altieri if he has enough money to back his bets. To this Altieri responds, "Win or bust."

Altieri then proceeds to execute his scam by initially pretending to be a poker novice. He fumbles his cards and requests a re-deal despite his having four-of-a-kind queens, explaining that he doesn't trust receiving such a strong hand so early. Within minutes he has fleeced his fellow players, and while waiting to make his exit via elevator, he reveals his scheme to a security guard standing beside him. In response, the security guard tells Altieri the elevator is not an exit at all and escorts the scamp into it. They then take the elevator to the casino's basement where Altieri meets The President, Corrado and Maria Luisa.

Production
According to Roberto Curti, Martino's contributions to the scrip were "just nominal". Ernesto Gastaldi stated that he "wrote the script with Enrico Maria Salerno in mind as the boss of a sharp - and not just violent - criminal organization which has succession problem when the son shows he's not cut from the same cloth as his father."

Gastaldi considers the script he wrote to be one of his best efforts, but stated that "I believe the actors were very good on this film, improving upon a story that, although not very original, was rather different from crime films of that era."
Gambling City was shot at Dear Studios in Rome and on location in Milan and Nice.

Release
Gambling City was released on January 23, 1975 in Italy where it was distributed by Medusa. The film grossed a total of 777,334,540 Italian lire on its theatrical run.

The film released on Region 0 NTSC DVD by NoShame films in 2005 as part of the "Sergio Martino Collection." The DVD is currently out-of-print.

Reception

Gambling City received little attention in the European or American press at its release, but experienced a revival in interest when now-defunct Italian cult-film company NoShame Films re-released it on DVD in 2005. At the time of its re-release New York Times reviewer Dave Kehr noted the "powerful, rhythmic sense of violence" the film shares with other Martino films. But Kehr's review primarily focused on the film as an early example of Martino's talents. Kehr praised the absolute lack of sentimentality displayed by a director who would go on to make over 50 feature-length films, including spaghetti westerns like A Man Called Blade (1977) and science-fiction fantasies like 2019: After the Fall of New York (1983).

Since the film's release on DVD, however, no other mainstream critics have commented on it, and what attention it has received from the blogosphere has been mostly negative. TwitchFilm.net reviewer "logboy" called it "a fairly odd experience," but qualified his disparagement with, "It has its saving graces in amount substantial enough to make it an interesting experience in many isolated regards." And Gambling City critic Matt Hwang called the film's score "something between the distorted wind-up chime of a broken Jack-in-the-Box and the Merry-go-Round accordion."

See also 
 List of Italian films of 1975

Footnotes

References

External links

1975 films
1970s Italian-language films

1970s crime thriller films
1970s action thriller films
Poliziotteschi films
Films directed by Sergio Martino
Films about gambling
Films with screenplays by Ernesto Gastaldi
1970s Italian films